Monteath is a surname. Notable people with the surname include: 

Alastair Monteath (1913–1942), New Zealand cricketer
Alec Monteath (1941–2021), Scottish actor and announcer for Scottish Television
Bruce Monteath (born 1955), Australian football player
David Monteath (1887–1961), British civil servant
James Monteath (1847–1929), Scottish administrator in British India
John Monteath (1878–1955), Irish cricketer and colonial official in British India
Peter Monteath (born 1961), Australian historian
Sue Monteath (born 1959), Australian football player